Thrombospondin-3 (TSP3) is a protein that in humans is encoded by the THBS3 gene.

The protein encoded by this gene belongs to the thrombospondin family. Thrombospondin family members are adhesive glycoproteins that mediate cell-to-cell and cell-to-matrix interactions. TSP3 has been found to be involved in the regulation of skeletal maturation. This protein forms a pentameric molecule linked by a single disulfide bond. This gene shares a common promoter with metaxin 1. Identified as the gene on chromosome 1 responsible for mediating an associated with genetic susceptibility to SARS-CoV-2 infection.

References

Further reading

Thrombospondins